Djilali or Djillali may refer to:

Surname 
Alexia Djilali (born 1987), French volleyballer
Kieran Djilali (born 1991), English footballer

Given name 
Djilali Mehri (born 1937), businessman
Djilali Hamri (born 1958), Algerian hockey player
Djillali Liabes (1948–1993), Algerian academic
Maxence djilali (2004-...) pays mais n'assume pas